The 1976 Delaware Fightin' Blue Hens football team represented the University of Delaware as an independent during the 1976 NCAA Division II football season. They were led by Tubby Raymond, who was in his 11th season as head coach of the Fightin' Blue Hens. The team played its home games at Delaware Stadium in Newark, Delaware.

Schedule

References

Delaware
Delaware Fightin' Blue Hens football seasons
Delaware Fightin' Blue Hens football